Badr Boulahroud (born 21 April 1993) is a Moroccan international footballer who plays for Saudi Arabian club Ohod as a midfielder.

Club career
Born in Rabat, Boulahroud began his career with hometown side FUS Rabat.

On 6 July 2018, Boulahroud signed a three-year deal with Spanish Segunda División side Málaga, for a reported fee of €600,000. He left Málaga in October 2020.

He returned to Morocco in February 2021 to sign for Raja.

On 25 July 2022, Boulahroud joined Saudi Arabian club Ohod.

International career
He made his senior international debut for Morocco in 2017.

International goals
Scores and results list Morocco's goal tally first.

References

External links

1993 births
Living people
People from Rabat
Moroccan footballers
Morocco international footballers
Fath Union Sport players
Málaga CF players
Raja CA players
Ohod Club players
Botola players
Segunda División players
Saudi First Division League players
Association football midfielders
Moroccan expatriate footballers
Moroccan expatriate sportspeople in Spain
Expatriate footballers in Spain
Moroccan expatriate sportspeople in Saudi Arabia
Expatriate footballers in Saudi Arabia
2018 African Nations Championship players
Morocco A' international footballers